Mrsklesy is a municipality and village in Olomouc District in the Olomouc Region of the Czech Republic. It has about 700 inhabitants.

Notable people
Egon Morbitzer (1927–1989), German violinist

References

Villages in Olomouc District